Sporting Clube de Portugal has a professional handball team based in Lisbon, Portugal, since 1932, and plays in Andebol 1. The club is one of the most decorated handball clubs in Portugal, having won 40 national titles and 2 international titles.

History
Handball was introduced in Sporting Clube de Portugal in 1932.

Sporting dominated Portuguese handball, particularly in the sixties and seventies and even in the eighties, with emphasis on the period from 1966 to 1973, in which seven National Championships were won in eight possible, five of which were consecutive, with a mythical team that became known as Os Sete Magníficos.

In 1995, Sporting fans were forced to choose the modalities to keep in the club, due to financial problems, having chosen handball and futsal, leading to the closure of the basketball, hockey and volleyball sections (which returned in the meantime).

Facilities

Pavilhão João Rocha
Pavilhão João Rocha is a multi-sports pavilion located in the parish of Lumiar, in Lisbon. Located next to the Estádio José Alvalade, it is the home of Sporting CP sports. In honor of one of the most distinguished figures in the history of Sporting, the pavilion was named after former club president, João Rocha, who remained in office from September 1973 to October 1986. Its inauguration took place on the day June 21, 2017.

Kits

Honours

Domestic competitions

 Portuguese League: 19
 1951–52, 1955–56, 1960–61, 1965–66, 1966–67, 1968–69, 1969–70, 1970–71, 1971–72, 1972–73, 1977–78, 1978–79, 1979–80, 1980–81, 1983–84, 1985–86, 2000–01, 2016–17, 2017–18
Divisão de Elite: 2
 2004–05, 2005–06
 Portuguese Cup: 16
 1971–72, 1972–73, 1974–75, 1980–81, 1982–83, 1987–88, 1988–89, 1997–98, 2000–01, 2002–03, 2003–04, 2004–05, 2011–12, 2012–13, 2013–14, 2021–22
 Portuguese Super Cup: 3
 1997–98, 2001–02, 2013–14

International competitions

EHF Challenge Cup: 2
 2009–10, 2016–17

 Double
Winners (4): 1971–72, 1972–73, 1980–81, 2000–01

Team
Team for the 2022–23 season.

Current squad

Goalkeepers
 20  André Bergsholm Kristensen
 40   Leonel Maciel
Left Wingers
 34  Étienne Mocquais
 77  Josep Folques Ortiz
Right Wingers 
 19  Mamadou Gassama Cissokho
 22  Francisco Tavares
Line players
 2  Edy Silva
 8  Jonas Bruus Tidemand 
 10  Patryk Walczak

Left Backs
 5  Edmilson Araújo
 13  Salvador Salvador
 79  Martim Costa
Central Backs
 7  Natan Suárez
 11  Carlos Ruesga
Right Backs
 6  Francisco Costa

Transfers
Transfers for the 2022–23 season

 Joining  
  Leonel Maciel (GK) (from  FC Barcelona Handbol)
  Étienne Mocquais (LW) (from  Tremblay-en-France)
  Edy Silva (P) (from   Esporte Clube Pinheiros)
  Patryk Walczak (P) (from  RK Vardar)

 Leaving   
  Matevž Skok (GK) (to  RK Gorenje Velenje)
  Yassine Belkaid (GK) (to  RK Celje)
  Erekle Arsenashvili (P) (to  BM Puente Genil)

Staff
 Head coach:  Ricardo Costa
 Assistant coach:  Pedro Biscaia
 Assistant coach:  Ricardo Candeias

Results in European competitions
Note: Sporting score is always listed first.

References

External links
Sporting Official Website
 

Sporting CP sports
Portuguese handball clubs